Harriet Newman Leve is a four-time Tony Award-winning Broadway producer.

Career
Harriet Leve is a four-time Tony Award-winning producer. She is currently co-producing the play Life of Pi, which is set to open on Broadway on March 31, 2023, with previews beginning March 9, 2023. Most recently, she co-produced the Broadway musical "Ain’t Too Proud: The Life and Times of the Temptations," which closed on Broadway on January 16, 2022. A production of Ain't Too Proud is set to open in London's West End on March 31, 2023.

Leve co-produced the world premiere of An American in Paris, based on the Oscar-winning film of the same name. An American in Paris debuted at the Théâtre du Châtelet in Paris on December 10, 2014, before transferring to Broadway.

Leve also co-produced the world premiere musical Beautiful: The Carole King Musical. She joined forces with Raise the Roof as a co-producer of the Broadway premiere of Hedwig and the Angry Inch at the Belasco Theatre. Hedwig opened on April 22, 2014.

She also is co-producing the National Tour production of STOMPand co-produced the original New York production, which ran for 29 years and closed on January 8th, 2023. The show was created and directed by Luke Cresswell and Steve McNicholas, and the large-format motion picture, PULSE: a Stomp Odyssey, which won the Giant Screen Theater Association's Film Achievement Award.

Broadway productions include Of Mice and Men starring James Franco and Chris O'Dowd, Ann: An Affectionate Portrait of Ann Richards written and performed by Emmy Award-winning actress Holland Taylor, the new Gershwin musical Nice Work If You Can Get It starring Matthew Broderick and Kelli O'Hara, the smash-hit comedy One Man, Two Guvnors starring James Corden, the Tony Award-winning production of War Horse at Lincoln Center, the Tony Award-winning productions of Alfred Hitchcock's The 39 Steps, and the Tony Award-winning production of Alan Ayckbourn's The Norman Conquests.

With the Raise the Roof partnerships, Leve co-produced The Mountaintop starring Samuel L. Jackson as Dr. Martin Luther King Jr., Burn the Floor on Broadway and the National Tour, Tracy Letts's Superior Donuts at the Music Box Theater on Broadway, Stephen Sondheim's A Little Night Music starring Catherine Zeta-Jones and Angela Lansbury, La Cage Aux Folles three-time Tony Award-winning production starring Kelsey Grammer and Douglas Hodges.

Other productions include: the Tony-nominated Broadway production of Martin McDonagh's The Lieutenant of Inishmore; the Broadway and national tour productions of Eve Ensler's The Good Body directed by Peter Askin; August Wilson's Ma Rainey's Black Bottom, directed by Marion McClinton and starring Whoopi Goldberg and Charles Dutton; the Tony nominated production of Arthur Miller's The Crucible, directed by Richard Eyre and starring Liam Neeson and Laura Linney; Hedda Gabler, directed by Nicholas Martin and starring Kate Burton; the Tony-nominated production of The Diary of Anne Frank, directed by James Lapine and starring Natalie Portman and Linda Lavin; Twilight: Los Angeles, 1992, written and performed by Anna Deavere Smith and directed by George C. Wolfe; and the Olivier Award-winning production of Kat and the Kings, book, lyrics and direction by David Kramer and music and arrangements by Taliep Petersen.

Off-Broadway productions include: Beebo Brinker Chronicles, based on the 1950s ground-breaking pulp novels by Ann Bannon, adapted and written by Kate Moira Ryan and Linda S. Chapman and directed by Leigh Silverman; Sherry Glaser's Family Secrets, directed by Bob Balaban; the international hit musical Shockheaded Peter; Eve Ensler's Necessary Targets, directed by Michael Wilson and starring Shirley Knight and Diane Venora; Alan Ayckbourn's Communicating Doors, directed by Christopher Ashley and starring Mary-Louise Parker.

Her Los Angeles productions include Wendy Wasserstein's Isn't It Romantic directed by Gerald Gutierez; Larry Kramer's The Normal Heart, directed by Arvin Brown and starring Richard Dreyfuss, Kathy Bates, and Bruce Davison; Sam Shepard's Curse of the Starving Class directed by Gillian Eaton and starring Carrie Snodgress and Brad Whitford.

Leve was the Vice President of Development for Tony Bill Film Productions and taught film workshops at the American Film Institute in Los Angeles. She wrote a chapter for the Commercial Theater Institute's Guide to Producing Plays and Musicals. She is a member of The Broadway League and was on the Board of Directors of New York Stage and Film for four years.

Theater

Broadway
Life of Pi [Play]
 Winner of 5 Olivier Awards, including Best New Play, 2022
 Opening on Broadway in March 2023

Ain't Too Proud: The Life and Times of the Temptations [Original, Musical]
 Cast featuring: Derrick Baskin, James Harkness, Jawan M. Jackson, Ephraim Sykes, and Jeremy Pope
 March 2019 - January 2022

Anastasia [Original, Musical]
 Cast featuring: Christy Altomare, Derek Klena, Ramin Karimloo, Mary Beth Peil and John Bolton
 March 23, 2017 - March 31, 2019

An American in Paris [Original, Musical]
 Cast featuring: Robert Fairchild, Jill Paice, Leanne Cope, Veanne Cox, Brandon Uranowitz and Max von Essen
 March 13, 2015 - October 9, 2016

Hedwig and the Angry Inch [Original, Musical] 
 Cast featuring: Neil Patrick Harris
 March 29, 2014 - September 13, 2015
Of Mice and Men [Revival, Play] 
 Cast featuring: James Franco, Chris O'Dowd, Leighton Meester
 March 19, 2014 - July 27, 2014 
Beautiful: The Carole King Musical [Original, Musical]
 Cast featuring: Jessie Mueller, Jake Epstein, Anika Larsen, and Jarrod Spector
 November 21, 2013 - October 27, 2019
Ann [Original, Play] 
 Written and Performed by Holland Taylor
 February 18, 2013 - June 30, 2013
Nice Work If You Can Get It [Original, Musical] 
 Cast featuring: Matthew Broderick, Kelli O'Hara (through March 24), Jessie Mueller (beginning March 29), Judy Kaye, Michael McGrath, Estelle Parsons (through December 16), and Blythe Danner (beginning December 18)
 April 24, 2012 - June 15, 2013
Dead Accounts [Original, Play] 
 Cast featuring: Katie Holmes, Norbert Leo Butz, Judy Greer, Jayne Houdyshell, and Josh Hamilton
 November 29, 2012 - January 6, 2013
One Man, Two Guvnors [Original, Play] 
 Cast featuring: James Corden
 April 18, 2012 - September 2, 2012
The Mountaintop [Original, Play] 
 Cast featuring: Samuel L. Jackson and Angela Bassett
 October 13, 2011 - January 22, 2012
War Horse [Original, Play] 
 April 14, 2011 - January 6, 2013
 Toronto Production February 2012 - January 2013
La Cage Aux Folles [Revival, Musical] 
 Cast featuring: Kelsey Grammer, Douglas Hodge, and A.J. Shively
 April 6, 2010 - May 1, 2011
A Little Night Music [Revival, Musical] 
 Cast featuring: Catherine Zeta-Jones (through June 20th), Angela Lansbury (through June 20th), Bernadette Peters (beginning July 13th), Elaine Stritch (beginning July 13th), Alexander Hanson, Erin Davie, Hunter Ryan Herdlicka, Leigh Ann Larkin, Aaron Lazar, and Ramona Mallory
 November 24, 2009 – January 9, 2011
Superior Donuts [Original, Play] 
 Cast featuring: Michael McKean, Jon Michael Hill, Yasen Peyankov, James Vincent Meredith, Kate Buddeke, Robert Maffia, Jane Alderman, Cliff Chamberlain, and Michael Garvey
 September 16, 2009 - January 3, 2010
Burn the Floor [Dance] 
 Cast Featuring: Maksim Chmerkovskiy, Karina Smirnoff, Henry Bayalikov, Sharna Burgess, Kevin Clifton, Sasha Farber, Jeremy Garner, Anya Garnis, Gordana Grandosek, Patrick Helm, Sarah Hives, Melanie Hooper, Peta Murgatroyd, Giselle Peacock, Sarah Soriano, Damon Sugden, Rebecca Sugden, Damian Whitewood, Trent Widdon, and Robin Windsor
 July 25, 2009 – January 10, 2010
The Norman Conquests [Revival, Play, Comedy] 
 Featuring the Original London Cast: Amelia Bullmore, Jessica Hynes, Stephen Mangan, Ben Miles, Paul Ritter, and Amanda Root
 April 23, 2009 – July 26, 2009
The 39 Steps  [Original, Play, Comedy] 
 Original Cast featuring Charles Edwards, Jennifer Ferrin, Cliff Saunders, and Arnie Burton
 January 15, 2008 – January 10, 2010
Coram Boy  [Original, Play, Drama, Play with music] 
 Cast featuring: Jolly Abraham, Uzo Aduba, Jacqueline Antaramian, Bill Camp, Dashiell Eaves, Xanthe Elbrick, Tom Riis Farrell, Brad Fleischer, Karron Graves, Laura Heisler, Angela Lin, David Macdonald, Quentin Maré, Jan Maxwell, Kathleen McNenny, Cristin Milioti, Charlotte Parry, Christina Rouner, Ivy Vahanian, and Wayne Wilcox. With a choir featuring Phillip Anderson, John Arbo, Sean Attebury, Renee Brna, Charlotte Cohn, Sean Cullen, Katie Geissinger, Zachary James, Tinashe Kajese, BJ Karpen, Katherine Keyes, Evangelia Kingsley, Eric Morris, Daniel Neer, Nina Negri, Mark Rehnstrom, Martin Sola, Samantha Soule, Alison Weller, and Greg Wright
 May 2, 2007 – May 27, 2007
The Lieutenant of Inishmore  [Original, Play, Comedy, Satire] 
 Cast featuring: Jeff Binder, Andrew Connolly, Dashiell Eaves, Peter Gerety, Domhnall Gleeson, Brian d'Arcy James, Alison Pill, and David Wilmot
 May 3, 2006–September 3, 2006
The Good Body [Original, Play, Solo] 
 Written by and Starring Eve Ensler
 November 15, 2004–December 19, 2004
Ma Rainey's Black Bottom  [Revival, Play, Drama] 
 Cast Featuring: Charles S. Dutton, Whoopi Goldberg, Thomas Jefferson Byrd, Tony Cucci, Carl Gordon, Stephen McKinley Henderson, Anthony Mackie, Heather Alicia Simms, Jack Davidson, and Louis Zorich
 February 6, 2003–April 6, 2003
The Crucible  [Revival, Play, Drama] 
 Cast Featuring: Liam Neeson, Laura Linney, John Benjamin Hickey, Christopher Evan Welch, Angela Bettis, and Tom Aldredge
 March 7, 2002–June 9, 2002
Hedda Gabler  [Revival, Play, Drama] 
 Cast Featuring: Kate Burton, Michael Emerson, Angela Thornton, David Lansbury, Jennifer VanDyck, Harris Yulin, and Maria Cellario
 October 4, 2001–January 13, 2002
Kat and the Kings  [Original, Musical, Comedy] 
 Cast Featuring: Jody J. Abrahams, Luqmaan Adams, Juniad Booysen, Terry Hector, Alistair Izobell, and Kim Louis
 August 19, 1999–January 2, 2000
The Diary of Anne Frank  [Revival, Play, Drama] 
 Cast Featuring: Natalie Portman, George Hearn, Linda Lavin, Harris Yulin, Austin Pendleton, Lori Wilner, Jonathan Kaplan, Missy Yager, Philip Goodwin, and Jessica Walling
 December 4, 1997–June 14, 1998
Twilight: Los Angeles, 1992  [Original, Play, Solo] 
 Written and Performed by Anna Deavere Smith
 April 17, 1994–June 19, 1994

Off-Broadway
The 39 Steps [Original, Play, Comedy] 
 Cast featuring: John Behlmann, Kate MacCluggage, Jamie Jackson, Cameron Folmar
 March 25, 2010 - January 16, 2011
The Beebo Brinker Chronicles [Original, Play, Drama]
 Original Cast Featuring: Carolyn Baeumler, Jenn Colella, Bill Dawes, Autumn Dornfeld, David Greenspan, and Marin Ireland
 February 19, 2008 – April 29, 2008
Family Secrets [Original, Play, Solo]
 Written by and Starring Sherry Glaser
 March 8, 2006 – April 9, 2006
Shockheaded Peter [Original, Musical, Comedy]
 Cast Featuring: Julian Bleach, Anthony Cairns, Luther Creek, Graeme Gilmour, Tamzin Griffin, Paul Kandel, Rebekah Wild, Fred Berman, Ritt Henn, Kevin Townley, and Josie Whittlesey
 February 22, 2005 – May 29, 2005
Necessary Targets [Original, Play, Drama]
 Cast Featuring: Shirley Knight, Diane Venora, Alyssa Bresnahan, Mirjana Jokovic, Sally Parrish, Maria Thayer and Catherine Kellner
 February 28, 2002 – April 21, 2002
Communicating Doors [Original, Play, Drama]
 Cast Featuring: Mary-Louise Parker, David McCallum, Patricia Hodges, Tom Beckett, Candy Buckley, and Gerrit Graham
 August 20, 1998 – January 3, 1999
Bunny Bunny [Original, Play, Comedy] 
 Cast Featuring: Paula Cale, Bruno Kirby, and Alan Tudyk
 March 23, 1997 – May 25, 1997
STOMP [Original, Instrumental] 
 February 27, 1994–January 8, 2023
Edith Stein [Original, Play] 
 Cast Featuring: Laura Esterman, Irene Dailey, Jim Abele, Stacie Chaiken, Katie Finneran, Sarah Lloyd, Tim Lord, Naomi Riseman, Susan Riskin, Norman Rose, and Terry Serpico
 January 8, 1994 – January 30, 1994

National Tours
Ain't Too Proud: The Life and Times of the Temptations [Original, Musical]
Currently on tour in the US
Beautiful: The Carole King Musical [Original, Musical] 
Currently on tour in the UK 
War Horse [Original, Play] 
June 2012 - Aug 2014
La Cage Aux Folles [Revival, Musical] 
Cast featuring: George Hamilton
October 2011 - November 2012
Burn the Floor [Dance] 
Cast Featuring: Robbie Kmentoni, Ashleigh Di Lello, Ryan Di Lello, Karen Hauer, and Janetter Manrara
 September 2010 - June 2011
The 39 Steps [Original, Play, Comedy] 
Cast featuring: Claire Brownell, Eric Hissom, Scott Parkinson, Ted Deasy, Sheffield Chastain, and Allison Jean White
August 2009 - June 2010

Los Angeles
Why We Have a Body [Original, Play]
 Cast Featuring: Nellie Cravens, Shareen Mitchell, K.K. Dodds, and Amy Resnick
 1995
Telegrams from Heaven [Original, Play]
 Cast Featuring: Renee Taylor, Valerie Landsburg, Peter Gregory, Rhonda Aldrich, Andrew Mark Berman, Edith Fields, Aaron Heyman, and Michael Kostoff
 1992
Family Secrets [Original, Play, Solo]
 Written by and Starring Sherry Glaser
 1990–1991
Excess Baggage [Original, Play]
 Cast Featuring: Larry Miller, Kathleen Clark, Jack Axelrod, Will Carney, Estelle Harris, Mitzi McCall, Claire O' Berry, Sarah Powers, George Solomon, and Paul Sylvan
 1988
The Curse of the Starving Class [Original, Play]
 Cast Featuring: Carrie Snodgress, Andrew Robinson, Thomas Callaway, Suzanne Calvert, Wayne Grace, Larry Hankin, Michael Hennessy, Brad Whitford, and Ping Wu
 July 20, 1985 – February 16, 1986
The Normal Heart [Original, Play, Drama]
 Cast Featuring: Richard Dreyfuss, Bruce Davison, Kathy Bates, Christopher Bradley, Vincent Caristi, William De Acutis, Kenneth Kimmins, Ben Murphy, and David Spielberg
 April 21, 1985 – July 7, 1985
Isn't It Romantic [Original, Play]
 Cast Featuring: Christine Estabrook, Joan Copeland, Anne Lange, Jo de Winter, Jerry Lanning, Michael Lembeck, Barney Martin, and Ian Patrick Williams
 October 18, 1984 – September 1, 1985

Films
PULSE: a STOMP Odyssey
 Created and Directed by Steve McNicholas and Luke Cresswell
 Cast Featuring: STOMP, Les Percussions de Guinée, Kodo, Eva Yerbabuena, Panchavadyam, and Timbala

A Call to Spy
 Directed by Lydia Dean Pilcher
 Cast Featuring: Sarah Megan Thomas, Stana Katic, Radhike Apte, Linus Roache

Radium Girls 
 Directed by Lydia Dean Pilcher and Ginny Mohler
 Cast Featuring: Joey King, Abby Quinn, Cara Seymour, and Colby Minifie

Books
The Commercial Theater Institute: Guide to Producing Plays and Musicals Copyright 2006 
 Contributed Chapter, "You Never Forget Your First Time"

Awards

An American in Paris
 2014 Outer Critics Circle Award for Best Musical

Hedwig and the Angry Inch
 2014 Tony Award for Best Revival of a Musical
 2014 Outer Critics Circle Award for Outstanding Revival of a Musical
 2014 Drama League Award for Outstanding Revival of a Musical

One Man, Two Guvnors
2012 Outer Critics Circle Award for Outstanding New Broadway Play

War Horse
2011 Outer Critics Circle Award for Outstanding New Broadway Play
2011 Drama Desk Award for Outstanding Play

La Cage Aux Folles
2010 Tony Award Best Revival of a Musical

The Norman Conquests
2009 Tony Award Best Revival of a Play
2009 Drama Desk Award for Outstanding Revival of a Play
2009 Outer Critics Circle Award for Outstanding Revival of a Play

The 39 Steps
2008 Drama Desk Award Unique Theatrical Experience

The Crucible
 2002 Outstanding Revival of a Musical or Revue

Stomp
 1994 Drama Desk Award Unique Theater Experience - Harriet Newman Leve

References

Place of birth missing (living people)
American theatre managers and producers
Year of birth missing (living people)
Living people